Bolívar is a town and municipality in the Cauca Department, Colombia. The population is primarily engaged in agriculture and ranching.

References

Municipalities of Cauca Department